Maurice Banide (20 May 1905 – 20 May 1995) was a professional French football player and manager. He played as a midfielder and was part of the Racing Club Paris side that won the Division 1 and Coupe de France double in 1936, as well as winning the Coupe de France in 1939 and 1940. He was also part of France's squad for the 1928 Summer Olympics, but he did not play in any matches.

Between 1929 and 1936, Banide was awarded nine caps for the France national football team, scoring one goal. After retiring from playing, he managed Chamois Niortais for two seasons, guiding the team to promotion to Division 3 in 1949.

References

External links
Maurice Banide profile at chamoisfc79.fr

1905 births
1995 deaths
French footballers
France international footballers
French football managers
Association football midfielders
RC Strasbourg Alsace players
FC Mulhouse players
Racing Club de France Football players
Chamois Niortais F.C. managers
Ligue 1 players
Ligue 2 players
Olympic footballers of France
Footballers at the 1928 Summer Olympics